Afifella marina  is a phototrophic bacterial species of the genus  Afifella.

References

Further reading

External links
Type strain of Afifella marina at BacDive -  the Bacterial Diversity Metadatabase

Hyphomicrobiales
Bacteria described in 2009